"Out of Mind, Out of Sight", also known as "Invisible Girl", is the eleventh episode of the first season of the television series Buffy the Vampire Slayer. In the episode, an invisible force is attacking people at the local school and Cordelia may be in danger. The relationship between Buffy and Cordelia grows closer. The title of the episode is a play on the proverb.

Plot
After her English class, Cordelia arranges to meet with the teacher the next day to talk about her paper. In the boys' locker room, Cordelia's boyfriend is attacked by an invisible assailant with a baseball bat and taken to hospital. Buffy enters the boys' locker room and finds the word "LOOK" spray-painted on the lockers. As Buffy approaches her, Harmony is pushed down the stairs by an invisible force and injures her ankle. The invisible thing bumps into Buffy before escaping.

As the Scooby Gang disperse, Buffy follows the sound of a flute. Looking over Willow's list of missing children, Buffy suspects Marcie when she sees she played the flute. Buffy finds Marcie's hideout. While Buffy is looking at Marcie's yearbook, Marciewho is invisibleis standing behind her with a knife. Marcie then finds Mrs. Miller, Cordelia's English teacher, and suffocates her with a plastic bag. Cordelia arrives a short while afterwards and saves Mrs. Miller. An invisible hand writes "LISTEN" on the blackboard.

In a flashback, Marcie is sitting in her literature class as she attempts to answer a question posed by the teacher and is looked over in favor of her classmates, even though she had her hand up. Her hand then starts to fade away. Giles realizes that Marcie did not willingly become invisible, but was made invisible due to people never noticing her existence. As the Scoobies think back to Harmony and Mitch, and flick through Marcie's yearbook, they find Cordelia's picture, horribly defaced. They realize that Marcie is after Cordelia, whom she resented for constantly being the center of attention; suddenly the latter walks into the library asking Buffy for protection. They explain to Cordelia who is following her and decide to use her as bait and to have Buffy bodyguard her.

Using recorded flute music, Marcie lures Willow, Xander and Giles into the boiler room where she closes the door and opens the gas, then grabs Cordelia as she is changing. Buffy follows Cordelia and finds her unconscious. Marcie injects Buffy with a sedative and renders her unconscious

Buffy and Cordelia wake up; they are tied to some chairs. They see the word "LEARN" written on a curtain, and Marcie says that Cordelia is the lessonor will be after Marcie surgically disfigures her face. Buffy kicks the instrument tray at Marcie and frees herself from the ropes. In the boiler room, Angel rescues the Scooby Gang and closes the gas valve. Buffy realizes that she must use her other senses to fight an invisible enemy; she concentrates, listening to Marcie, and knocks her into a curtain before knocking her out. After Buffy frees Cordelia, two mysterious FBI agents arrive to haul Marcie away.

Marcie is taken by the FBI to a school of invisible students. She sits down in class and opens her textbook, called Assassination and Infiltration, of which she approves.

Broadcast and reception
"Out of Mind, Out of Sight" was first broadcast on The WB. It received a Nielsen rating of 2.3 on its initial airing. Noel Murray of The A.V. Club rated the episode B, writing that it "comes awfully close to being a classic, but can't quite overcome ... some erratic performances and a plot that's more busy than necessary". He praised the more subtle scenes but said that it was "a little too blunt about its metaphor". DVD Talk's Phillip Duncan called "Out of Mind, Out of Sight" "[a]n ingenious combination of monster and social commentary [that] make this another standout episode". A review from the BBC was also positive, describing it as a "clever script" with "a carefully polished plot".

References

External links
 

Buffy the Vampire Slayer (season 1) episodes
1997 American television episodes
Fiction about invisibility
Federal Bureau of Investigation in fiction
Television episodes about revenge
Television episodes about abduction
Television episodes about bullying
Fictional government investigations of the paranormal

it:Episodi di Buffy l'ammazzavampiri (prima stagione)#La riunione